WJVR (101.9 MHz, "The River") is a commercial FM radio station licensed to Iron Gate, Virginia, serving Covington and Clifton Forge in Virginia.  It has a classic rock radio format and is owned and operated by Todd P. Robinson.  It also carries Alleghany High School sports.  The studios and offices are on Oak Street in Covington.

WJVR has an effective radiated power (ERP) of 560 watts as a Class A station.  Its transmitter is off Valley Ridge Road in Covington, within the George Washington and Jefferson National Forests.

History

Construction
On April 5, 2012, the Federal Communications Commission (FCC) announced United States CP, LLC. as the highest bidder for the 101.9 FM frequency.  It would be located in Iron Gate, Virginia, as part of Auction 93.  On September 10, 2012, United States CP, LLC., filed a construction permit for a radio station to broadcast on 101.9 FM.  The new station would transmit from a mountain between Covington and Clifton Forge.

On October 9, 2012, the station was given the call sign WJVR.  The call sign is a "tribute" to the Jackson River that flows through Covington and Clifton Forge.

Launch to present
An October 10, 2012 post on the station's official Facebook page announced the station would launch on October 12 at 5:00pm.  The station received a license from the FCC on November 21, 2012.

United States CP, LLC sold WJVR to Todd P. Robinson, Inc. for $30,000 on March 24, 2014.  WJVR will be operated under the WVJT, LLC licensee.  On April 4, 2014, WJVR began streaming their broadcasts online. The sale was consummated on July 31, 2014.

References

External links
101.9 The River Online

2012 establishments in Virginia
Classic rock radio stations in the United States
Radio stations established in 2012
JVR